Coren is a variant of the Roman masculine and female given name Corina meaning "spear".

It was the surname of the following people:
Alan Coren (1938–2007), English journalist and satirist
Anna Coren (born 1975), Australian journalist and television presenter
Finn Coren (born 1961), Norwegian musician
Giles Coren (born 1969), English journalist
Michael Coren (born 1959), Canadian columnist and radio personality
Richard Coren, American bridge player
Stanley Coren (born 1942), U.S. psychologist and student of dog behavior
Victoria Coren Mitchell (born 1972), English journalist and poker player
Yitzhak Coren (1911–1994), Israeli politician and Yiddish writer

See also
Koren